The Enterprise Information Technology Data Repository (EITDR) is the United States Air Force official database, presented as a webservice, for registering information technology (IT) systems and maintaining portfolio management data. This database provides IT portfolio managers and senior leaders with investment decision support and the ability to track and report compliance with federal laws and regulations. EITDR provides automated IT management processes, a common access point to gather, view, load, update, query, report and store pertinent data from disparate systems. EITDR serves as a single point of user entry for AF IT data and has electronic interface to other DoD/AF systems requiring the data.

United States Code, Title 40, Subtitle III, Chapter 113, requires the Air Force Chief Information Officer to implement a portfolio management process for maximizing the value and assessing and managing risks associated with information technology acquisition and use. EITDR was the result of this law.

The Office of the Secretary of the Air Force, Warfighting Integration and Chief Information Officer (SAF/XC) has primary responsibility. As of November 30, 2006, EITDR recorded 146 systems with operating budgets exceeding $1 million. In addition, FY06 EITDR operations and maintenance costs totaled $4.3 million.

On May 1, 2017, EITDR was replaced by ITIPS as the system of record for IT compliance.

References

Databases
United States Air Force